is a 2011 Japanese comedy film directed by Katsuya Tomita.

Cast
 Wesley Bandeira
 Chie Kudô
 Chika Kumada
 Shinji Miyadai
 Tomohito Nakajima
 Ai Ozaki
 Fabiano Salgado
 Ayano Sekine
 Yasushi Sumida
 Tsuyoshi Takano
 Tomoko Takeda

References

External links
 

2011 films
2011 comedy films
Japanese comedy films
2010s Japanese-language films
2010s Japanese films